The Alternative Democratic Pole (Spanish: Polo Democrático Alternativo or PDA) is a left-wing political party in Colombia.

It was founded as a political alliance of the Independent Democratic Pole (PDI) and the Democratic Alternative (AD) in December 2005. Both parties opposed the neoliberal economic program, securitization and militarization of Colombia under then-President Álvaro Uribe. Subsequently, it was the only parliamentary party to declare opposition to the government of Juan Manuel Santos, and has joined the opposition against the government of Ivan Duque.

As of 2009, a considerable part of PDA politicians consist of former guerrilla fighters who gave up armed struggle and demobilized during the late 1980s and early 1990s. As of 2012, a considerable part of PDA politicians including the former guerrilla fighters are affiliated by will to the Green Party or to Movimiento Progresistas, or by disciplinary action to Marcha Patriótica, instead of PDA.

Political development
The PDI and AD initially had their own pre-candidates for the 2006 presidential race. PDI had nominated Antonio Navarro (former leader of M-19) and AD had nominated Carlos Gaviria.

In a primary election held on March 12, 2006, Gaviria won the presidential nomination of the PDA.

In the simultaneous legislative elections of 2006, the party won 9 out of 166 Deputies and 11 out of 100 senators.

At the presidential elections of 28 May 2006, Carlos Gaviria came second with 22.04% of the vote, 2,613,157 votes. This was the highest ever result for a left-wing candidate in Colombia's history. Thus, the party replaced the long-standing Liberal Party as the country's second force and main opposition party.

After the election, the PDA was successful in gaining the support of groups representing the indigenous movement which affiliated with the coalition. Also, on its fourth national congress, the guerrilla group National Liberation Army (ELN) commented favorably about the PDA's electoral performance and declared that political action should take precedence over armed struggle. Though, PDA is not related to guerrillas or any other armed factions as they clearly state in their founding doctrine: "We oppose to war and to the exercise of violence as means to political action".

The PDA could further consolidate its organization and gain support on a local level. In October 2007, the PDA's candidate, Samuel Moreno Rojas won the mayoral election in Colombia's capital Bogotá.

In the 2010 congressional election, PDA's support declined. It won 7.8% of votes and 8 of 100 seats in the Senate, and 5.9% of the vote and 4 of 164 seats in the House of Representatives, demoting it to the sixth rank among parliamentary parties. Before the election, a faction of the PDA had split off and joined the Green Party.

Clara Lopez was the party's candidate for the 2014 presidential election; she placed fourth in the first round of the election, receiving 1,958,414 votes, representing 15.23%.

For the 2022 presidential and parliamentary election the party has joined forces with other left-wing and centre-left parties to form the Historic Pact for Colombia alliance, whose candidates, Gustavo Petro and PDA member Francia Márquez, were victorious in the second round of the presidential election, making them the first leftists to assume the Presidency and Vice-Presidency in Colombian history. In parliamentary elections the PHxC lists, including PDA members, won the most votes in both the Chamber of Representatives and Senatorial elections.

Electoral history

Presidential elections

See also
Politics of Colombia
List of political parties in Colombia

References

External links

Polo Democrático Alternativo (Homepage, Spanish)
Ideario de Unidad del Polo Democrático Alternativo (Party's political program, Spanish)
Democracia a distancia: Elecciones 2006 (Portalcol.com) (Information about the Pole's list of candidates to the Colombian Senate, Spanish).

2005 establishments in Colombia
Former member parties of the Socialist International
Foro de São Paulo
Political parties established in 2005
Social democratic parties in Colombia